Matreya Natasha Fedor (born March 11, 1997) is a Canadian actress. She is known for her role as Echo Zizzleswift in Mr. Young, and for her recurring roles as Phoebe Collins in The Troop and as Allison Weston in Cedar Cove.

Life and career 
Matreya Fedor was born on March 11, 1997, in Vancouver, British Columbia, Canada. Since 2006, she has acted in several 'shorts' and television shows, and appeared in a few feature films. She had a recurring role in the Nickelodeon series The Troop, and co-starred in the sitcom Mr. Young along with Brendan Meyer. She appeared in a music video for the song Never Too Late by Three Days Grace. She also appeared in a commercial for Carnival Cruise Lines. Matreya was cast as Ava in the 2015 UpTV Network movie My One Christmas Wish starring Glee actress Amber Riley.

Filmography

References

External links 
 
 

1997 births
Actresses from Vancouver
Canadian child actresses
Canadian film actresses
Canadian people of Mexican descent
Canadian television actresses
Living people